OTJ Moravany nad Váhom was a Slovak football team, based in the town of Moravany nad Váhom. The club was founded in 1929. This club had students, adolescents and men. Today is name of club OŠK Moravany nad Váhom.

Stadium
The team host its matches at Štadión v Moravanoch, nicknamed "Zelenák".
- Number of seats: 1018 (348 of which covered)
- Western grandstand capacity: 588 (of which 300 covered)
- Capacity V.I.P. stands: 48 (indoor)
- Sector reviews: 144 (uncovered)
- Number of toilets for spectators: 2 (1 + 1 × male × female)
- The number of refreshment stalls: 1
- Number of cash: 2
- Court dimensions: 105 x 66 m
- Total area: 111 x 70 m
- Fence board: yes
- Large nets behind the goals: yes
- Scoreboard: 1 piece

External links 
Unofficial club website 

Moravany nad Vahom
Association football clubs established in 1929
1929 establishments in Slovakia